The yellow-backed tanager (Hemithraupis flavicollis) is a species of bird in the family Thraupidae, the tanagers.

It is found in Bolivia, Brazil, Colombia, Ecuador, French Guiana, Guyana, Peru, Suriname; also extreme eastern Panama in Central America. Its natural habitats are subtropical or tropical moist lowland forest and heavily degraded former forest.

References

External links
Yellow-backed Tanager videos on the Internet Bird Collection
Stamps (for Suriname) with RangeMap
Yellow-backed Tanager photo gallery VIREO Photo-High Res-(Close-up)

yellow-backed tanager
Birds of the Amazon Basin
Birds of the Guianas
Birds of the Venezuelan Amazon
Birds of the Colombian Amazon
Birds of the Ecuadorian Amazon
Birds of the Peruvian Amazon
Birds of the Atlantic Forest
yellow-backed tanager
Taxa named by Louis Jean Pierre Vieillot
Taxonomy articles created by Polbot